Ahir Bhairav is a 2007 Indian Assamese language drama film directed by Siva Prasad Thakur and produced by  Dr Ronen Sarma, under the banner of Rondeep Productions (UK) Ltd. This is the first ever Assamese movie that was entirely shot in the UK and was the Assamese's second film to be shot outside India after Hiya Diya Niya (2000). It has been chosen by the British Film Institute, London, to be preserved in its archive.

Director Siva Prasad Thakur had won the best international director award for this film at the New York Independent International Film Festival, 2008.

Synopsis
The story revolves around a PIO Indian woman with schizophrenia and its impact on those close to her.

Casts
Kopil Bora as Ruben
Zerifa Wahid as Nikita
Purabi Sarma as Manisha
Bidyut Chakravarty as Ravik
Mridula Barua as Jolly
Madhurima Chowdhury as Angelika
Ellora Barua (Guest appearance)
Gita Lahkar (Guest appearance)
Munmi Chakravarty (Guest appearance)
Kirip Chaliha (Guest appearance)
Abani Bora (Guest appearance)
Siva Prasad Thakur (Guest appearance)
Alex Knight ( Guest appearance)
Sarah Rose (Guest appearance)

See also
Jollywood

References

External links
Ahir Bhairav at Prag Play

2007 films
Films shot in the United Kingdom
2000s Assamese-language films